"Closer" is a 2004 song written by M. Palmer, A. Failla, B. Tartaglia and performed by Slinkee Minx. It was released in December 2004 and peaked at number 39 on the ARIA Charts.

Track listing
 "Closer" (Video Mix) – 3:51
 "Careless Whisper" (Radio Edit) – 4:08
 "Careless Whisper" (Zander Edit) – 4:05
 "Closer" (KCB NRG Mix) – 7:18
 "Closer" (Mike Felks Club Mix) – 6:33
 "Summer Rain" (Alex K Klubbed Up Mix) – 6:06

Charts

References

2004 singles
Slinkee Minx songs
2004 songs